ʻAbd al-ʻAẓīm (ALA-LC romanization of ) is a male Muslim given name. It is built from the Arabic words ʻabd and al-ʻAẓīm, one of the names of God in the Qur'an, which give rise to the Muslim theophoric names. 

It may refer to:
Abd al-Azim al-Hasani
'Abd al-'Azim 'Anis
Abdel Azim Ashry (1911–1997), Egyptian basketball player
Abdul Azim al-Deeb (1929-2010), Egyptian professor of jurisprudence at Qatar University
Wajih Abdel-Azim, Egyptian footballer 
Abdul-Adeem Karjimi, Moroccan footballer

See also
Shah-Abdol-Azim shrine, shrine in Rey, Iran

References

Arabic masculine given names